Andrew Velazquez (born July 14, 1994), nicknamed "Squid", is an American professional baseball infielder for the Los Angeles Angels of Major League Baseball (MLB). He previously played in MLB for the Tampa Bay Rays, Cleveland Indians, Baltimore Orioles and New York Yankees. Velazquez made his MLB debut in 2018.

Early life and career
Velazquez is from Morris Park in the Bronx, a borough of New York City. His father, Kenneth, worked in the New York City Police Department as a detective and undercover narcotics officer for 20 years. His mother, Margaret, was a school teacher.

Velazquez attended Fordham Preparatory School, where he played for the school's baseball team. He played as a center fielder until his senior year, when he became the team's starting shortstop. In his senior year, the New York Post named Velazquez their All-Bronx Baseball Player of the Year.  Velazquez also competed on the Prep's track and field team, as a sprinter and high jumper. He received an athletic scholarship to attend Virginia Polytechnic Institute and State University (Virginia Tech) to play college baseball for the Virginia Tech Hokies.

Professional career

Arizona Diamondbacks 
The Arizona Diamondbacks selected him in the seventh round, with the 243rd overall selection, of the 2012 Major League Baseball draft. He signed with the Diamondbacks, receiving a $200,000 signing bonus, bypassing his commitment to Virginia Tech. That year, he made his professional debut with the Rookie-level Arizona League Diamondbacks of the Arizona League and the Missoula Osprey of the Pioneer League.

In 2013, Velazquez was assigned to the South Bend Silver Hawks of the Class A Midwest League. For the season, he had a .260 batting average, but had almost three times as many strikeouts as walks. Returning to South Bend in 2014, Velazquez set a Minor League Baseball record with his 72nd consecutive game reaching base, breaking the record of 71 set by Kevin Millar in 1997 and tied by Kevin Youkilis in 2003. His streak, which lasted from April 22 to July 16, ended at 74 consecutive games. After the season, Velazquez was named the Midwest League Prospect of the Year. While playing in the Diamonbacks system, he was given the nickname "Squid".

Tampa Bay Rays 

On November 14, 2014, the Diamondbacks traded Velazquez and Justin Williams to the Tampa Bay Rays for Jeremy Hellickson. He began the 2015 season with the Charlotte Stone Crabs of the Class A-Advanced Florida State League, but underwent surgery in May to repair a broken hamate bone. He finished the season hitting .290/.343/.360 in 47 games. He returned to Charlotte in 2016, where he finished an injury shortened season hitting .262/.313/.308 in 75 games. Velazquez played for the Montgomery Biscuits of the Class AA Southern League in 2017 and Montgomery and the Durham Bulls of the Class AAA International League in 2018.

On September 2, 2018, the Rays promoted Velazquez to the major leagues. He recorded three hits in ten at-bats playing off the bench. Despite only playing 34.2 innings and making only one start, Velazquez played at least one inning at six positions (second base, shortstop, third base, left field, center field, and right field).

Cleveland Indians
On July 3, 2019, the Rays traded Velazquez to the Cleveland Indians in exchange for international bonus pool allotments. In a corresponding move the Indians designated Chih-Wei Hu for assignment. Cleveland assigned Velazquez to the Columbus Clippers of the International League, and promoted him to the major leagues on September 17. He appeared in five games for Cleveland, registering one hit, a double, in 11 at bats.

Velazquez was designated for assignment on February 14, 2020, when they signed Domingo Santana.

Baltimore Orioles
Velazquez was claimed off waivers by the Baltimore Orioles on February 19, 2020. In 2020 for the Orioles, Velazquez slashed .159/.274/.206 with no home runs and three RBIs. On October 29, 2020, Velazquez was outrighted off of the 40-man roster. He became a free agent on November 2, 2020.

New York Yankees
On December 16, 2020, Velazquez signed a minor league contract with the New York Yankees organization. On July 16, 2021, Velazquez was released by the Yankees organization, but re-signed with the team the next day on a new minor league deal. On August 9, the Yankees promoted Velazquez to the major leagues. On August 10, 2021, Velazquez scored his first Yankees run on a wild pitch.

In seven at bats in a series against the Boston Red Sox, Velazquez tallied three run-scoring hits with 4 RBIs, (one run of his own, and a stolen base). After closing out the final game with a diving catch at shortstop and a difficult throw to first base from deep in the hole, his teammates awarded him the well-deserved "game belt" in recognition of his contributions to the series sweep that saw the team move into first place of the Wild Card standings; two games ahead of the rival Red Sox.

On August 21, Velazquez hit his first career home run during a home game against the Minnesota Twins at Yankee Stadium off pitcher Ralph Garza.

On September 11, following the team’s victory over the New York Mets, Velazquez was demoted to the Yankees’s Triple-A affiliate, the Scranton Wilkes-Barre RailRiders. He was recalled to the Yankees prior to the penultimate game of the regular season on October 2.

Los Angeles Angels
On November 5, 2021, Velazquez was claimed off waivers by the Los Angeles Angels. He opened the 2022 season with the Salt Lake Bees of the Class AAA Pacific Coast League and was promoted to the major leagues on April 12 to be the starting shortstop as David Fletcher was injured. On September 13, 2022, during a game against the Cleveland Guardians, Velazquez suffered a right meniscus tear, ending his season. In 125 games, Velazquez batted .196/.236/.304 with 10 home runs and 37 RBIs.

References

External links

1994 births
Arizona League Diamondbacks players
Baltimore Orioles players
Charlotte Stone Crabs players
Cleveland Indians players
Columbus Clippers players
Criollos de Caguas players
Durham Bulls players
Gulf Coast Rays players
Fordham Preparatory School alumni
Indios de Mayagüez players
Liga de Béisbol Profesional Roberto Clemente infielders
Living people
Los Angeles Angels players
Major League Baseball infielders
Missoula Osprey players
Montgomery Biscuits players
New York Yankees players
Scranton/Wilkes-Barre RailRiders players
South Bend Silver Hawks players
Sportspeople from the Bronx
Baseball players from New York City
Tampa Bay Rays players